Jorja is a feminine given name related to Georgia which may refer to:

 Jorja Chalmers, Australian saxophone and keyboard player
 Jorja Douglas, winner of Got What It Takes? (series 2), a British children's talent show and member of FLO
 Jorja Fleezanis, American violinist
 Jorja Fox (born 1968), American actress and producer
 Jorja Leap, American anthropologist, author, and social worker
 Jorja Monatella, a character in the Dean Koontz novel Strangers
 Jorja Smith (born 1997), English singer-songwriter

See also
 Jorgjia Filçe-Truja (1907–1994), Albanian soprano

Feminine given names